Mathias Samuel Soundra Pandian (16 December 1958 – 10 November 2014) was an eminent social scientist whose area of research covered the Dravidian Movement, South Indian politics, cinema, caste, identity and several other socially relevant issues. Pandian joined the Jawaharlal Nehru University (JNU), Delhi as a professor in 2009. At the time of his death, he was serving in the School of Social Sciences’ Centre for Historical Studies where he offered courses on ‘Region, Language and the Politics of Nation Making’ and ‘Caste, Culture and Communication: An Alternative Intellectual History of Modern India’.

He died on 10 November 2014, in Delhi following a cardiac arrest.

Education and academic career 

Pandian was a native of Marthandam, a town in Kanyakumari district. Pandian completed his B.A. in economics from Scott Christian College, Nagercoil in 1978. He then shifted to Chennai to pursue his post graduation in Economics from The Madras Christian College (MCC). He completed the degree in 1980. He finished his Ph.D. from Madras University in 1987. He worked at the Madras Institute of Development Studies (MIDS), Madras as an associate professor from 1989 to 2001. He had taught briefly as an Adjunct Faculty at the Asian College of Journalism (ACJ) in Chennai. He was the Honorary Visiting Fellow, Sarai Programme at the Centre for the Study of Developing Societies (CSDS), Delhi during the period of 2002–2009. Pandian joined the Jawaharlal Nehru University, Delhi in 2009 and continued in the post till his untimely death in 2014.

Pandian has been the Rama Wattamul Distinguished Indian Scholar at the University of Hawaii, Honolulu in 2008. the other posts he held include: visiting fellow, Centre of South Asian Studies at the Cambridge University in 2004; visiting professor in human sciences at the George Washington University in Washington, D.C., in 2002.

Published works

M.S.S. Pandian has also co-edited Muslims, Dalits and Fabrications of History: Subaltern Studies: Writings on South Asian History and Society, Vol. 12 (2005)

References

External links 
 http://www.thehindu.com/todays-paper/tp-national/tp-tamilnadu/mss-pandian-laid-to-rest-in-marthandam/article6597299.ece
 http://www.sagepub.in/authorDetails.nav?contribId=523058

1958 births
2014 deaths
20th-century Indian social scientists
Scientists from Tamil Nadu
People from Kanyakumari district